"Nasha Historiya" (Belarusian "Наша Гісторыя") is a Belarusian popular science illustrated magazine. "Nasha Historiya" stands for "Our History" in English.

The first issue of the journal was published on August 17, 2018, by the editors of the Internet portal "Nasha Niva". The first print was sold out within a few days, leading to an additional edition. Andrej Dyńko is the chief editor.

Nasha Historiya magazine sections:

 Where is our family; 
 
 Biography;
 
 Politics; 
 
 Commonwealth;
 
 Military glory; 
 
 USSR; 
 
 Peoples of Belarus; 
 
 Pro-world; 
 
 Tourist destinations; 
 
 Our dish; 
 
 Kitchen stories; 
 
 Simple things; 
 
 Economics; 
 
 Jokes; 
 
 Comics.

References 

Popular science magazines
2018 in Belarus
2018 establishments
Magazines published in Belarus
Belarusian-language mass media